Antonio de Nigris Guajardo (1 April 1978 – 15 November 2009) was a Mexican professional footballer who played as a striker.

During his career, which was cut short at 31 by a fatal heart attack, he played in six countries, also representing twelve clubs in nine years.

Club career
Born in Monterrey, Nuevo León, de Nigris became interested in sports at a young age, and began his football career with C.F. Monterrey. In February 2003, he was loaned to Villarreal CF in Spain's La Liga, joining a team in 13th place but averaging under a goal a game. He made his debut on 2 March, coming on as a 70th-minute substitute for Javier Farinós and scoring the last-minute winner for a 2–1 victory at home to Rayo Vallecano.

De Nigris, who could play freely in the European Union due to his Italian passport, moved on a permanent deal to Polideportivo Ejido in the Segunda División in July 2003. As with his time at Villarreal, he scored only twice in his one season in the province of Almería.

De Nigris returned to the Americas with Once Caldas of Colombia, with whom, in the 2004 Intercontinental Cup, he scored in the penalty shootout defeat against F.C. Porto. After playing for Club Puebla, Club Universidad Nacional and Monterrey again back home, he was signed by Santos FC of Brazil on 20 March 2006, making his debut against Brasiliense Futebol Clube in a Copa do Brasil match.

Later in 2006, de Nigris switched to Turkey, playing in quick succession for three teams in the country: Gaziantepspor, Ankaraspor and Ankaragücü. He was released from the latter due to heart problems, and his license was cancelled by the Turkish Football Federation. In 2009–10, he moved teams again, signing with Greek outfit AEL 1964 for two years.

International career
A Mexican international since 2001, de Nigris represented his nation at that year's Copa América. His debut came on 7 March in a friendly against Brazil in Guadalajara, scoring the 2–0 goal in an eventual 3–3 draw. Eighteen days later he scored twice in a 4–0 home win over Jamaica in 2002 FIFA World Cup qualification.

After a seven-year absence in the national squad, de Nigris was called by national coach Hugo Sánchez for a friendly match against the United States, on 6 February 2008. He underperformed in that match and was substituted, but would also appear against Ghana in London; he totalled 17 appearances with four goals until his death, at 31.

Personal life
De Nigris' younger brother Aldo is also a footballer (also a striker, he too represented Monterrey and the national team), while older sibling Alfonso is an actor and model. He is also of Italian descent and was given the nickname Tano by his Italian grandfather.

On 16 November 2009, Jorge Urdiales, president of former club Monterrey, confirmed de Nigris had died, apparently from a heart attack.

Career statistics

International

International goals

|-
| 1. || 7 March 2001 || Estadio Jalisco, Guadalajara, Mexico ||  || align=center|2–0 || align=center| 3–3 || Friendly
|-
| 2. || 25 March 2001 || Estadio Azteca, Mexico City, Mexico ||  || align=center|1–0 || align=center| 4–0 || 2002 World Cup qualification
|-
| 3. || 25 March 2001 || Estadio Azteca, Mexico City, Mexico ||  || align=center|2–0 || align=center| 4–0 || 2002 World Cup qualification
|-
| 4. || 23 August 2001 || Estadio Luis de la Fuente, Veracruz, Mexico ||  || align=center|5–4 || align=center| 5–4 || Friendly
|}

References

External links
 
 
 Addicion Rayada profile 
 Photos at Addicion Rayada 

1978 births
2009 deaths
Sportspeople from Monterrey
Footballers from Nuevo León
Mexican people of Italian descent
Citizens of Italy through descent
Association football forwards
Liga MX players
C.F. Monterrey players
Club América footballers
Club Universidad Nacional footballers
La Liga players
Segunda División players
Villarreal CF players
Polideportivo Ejido footballers
Categoría Primera A players
Once Caldas footballers
Santos FC players
Süper Lig players
Gaziantepspor footballers
Ankaraspor footballers
MKE Ankaragücü footballers
Super League Greece players
Athlitiki Enosi Larissa F.C. players
Mexico international footballers
2001 FIFA Confederations Cup players
2001 Copa América players
2002 CONCACAF Gold Cup players
Mexican expatriate footballers
Expatriate footballers in Spain
Expatriate footballers in Colombia
Expatriate footballers in Brazil
Expatriate footballers in Turkey
Expatriate footballers in Greece
Mexican footballers